Israel competed at the 1968 Summer Olympics in Mexico City, Mexico. 29 competitors, 26 men and 3 women, took part in 20 events in 4 sports.

Results by event

Athletics

Football

Preliminary round - Group C
During the Group C competition, Ghana replaced Morocco, after Morocco refused to play Israel.

Standings

Matches

Quarter-finals

Final ranking

Bracket

Matches

Bulgaria progressed after a drawing of lots.

Goal scorers
4 goals
 Yehoshua Feigenbaum

2 goals
 Giora Spiegel

1 goal
 Mordechai Spiegler
 Rachamim Talbi
 Shraga Bar

Squad
Head coach: Emanuel Schaffer

Shooting

Four shooters, all men, represented Israel in 1968.

Swimming

References

Nations at the 1968 Summer Olympics
1968 Summer Olympics
Summer Olympics